National Lyceum (Liceu Nacional) is a lyceum (secondary school) located at Avenida Marginal 12 Julho in the city of São Tomé, São Tomé and Príncipe. It is one of the oldest secondary schools in the nation. It currently has an estimate of 6,000 students. The lyceum is located on the seafront, east of the city centre.  

The lyceum was opened on 6 October 1969 as a technical school, Escola Técnica Silva e Cunha. The building was designed by architect Mário de Oliveira, who was also responsible for the 1962 urbanisation plan for São Tomé. It became a liceu after independence. For 36 years, until 2011, it was the only high school in the country.

Notable alumni
Tomé Vera Cruz, Prime Minister of São Tomé and Príncipe from 2006-2008, class of 1975

See also
List of buildings and structures in São Tomé and Príncipe

References

Buildings and structures in São Tomé
Schools in São Tomé and Príncipe
1969 establishments in São Tomé and Príncipe
Portuguese colonial architecture in São Tomé and Príncipe